Yevgeny Nikolayevich Frolov (born 29 January 1986) is a Russian former professional football player.

Club career
He made his Russian Football National League debut for FC Metallurg Lipetsk on 9 July 2005 in a game against FC Fakel Voronezh.

External links
 

1986 births
Sportspeople from Lipetsk
Living people
Russian footballers
Association football defenders
FC Spartak Tambov players
FC Metallurg Lipetsk players